Heritage Cup may refer to:

Heritage Cup (box lacrosse), an international box lacrosse tournament between the national teams of Canada, the United States, and the Iroquois Confederacy
Heritage Cup (MLS), an annual cup rivalry between the Major League Soccer teams San Jose Earthquakes and Seattle Sounders FC
NXT UK Heritage Cup, a professional wrestling title promoted by WWE.